Mount Vernon is an unincorporated community in Whitfield County, in the U.S. state of Georgia.

History
The first permanent settlement at Mount Vernon was made in 1830.

References

Unincorporated communities in Whitfield County, Georgia
Unincorporated communities in Georgia (U.S. state)